Karlsøy is a village in the municipality of Hamarøy in Nordland county, Norway. Sagfjord Church is located in Karlsøy, serving the residents of this part of Hamarøy.

References

Hamarøy
Villages in Nordland